Henry Albert Edwards (January 29, 1919 – June 22, 1988) was an American professional baseball outfielder. He had an injury-plagued career, suffering at various times from a broken ankle, a fractured collarbone and a dislocated shoulder.

Biography
Edwards was a native of Elmwood Place, Ohio.

After playing for the Indians between 1941 and 1943, Edwards had his career interrupted by service in the United States Army in 1944–45 during World War II. Edwards batted .301 that season, and started 116 games as the Indians' right fielder.

In his 11 major league seasons, he played in 735 games and had 2,191 at bats, 285 runs, 613 hits, 116 doubles, 41 triples, 51 home runs, 276 runs batted in, nine stolen bases and 208 bases on balls, with a .280 batting average, .343 on-base percentage and .440 slugging percentage. He amassed 964 total bases and was credited with eight sacrifice hits. He finished his career with a .981 fielding percentage playing at all three outfield positions.

Edwards' last MLB season was 1953, and he played minor league baseball until 1956. He died in Anaheim, California, at the age of 69.

See also
 List of Major League Baseball annual triples leaders

References

External links

1919 births
1988 deaths
United States Army personnel of World War II
Austin Senators players
Baltimore Orioles (IL) players
Baseball players from Ohio
Brooklyn Dodgers players
Cedar Rapids Raiders players
Charleston Senators players
Chicago Cubs players
Chicago White Sox players
Cincinnati Reds players
Cleveland Indians players
Major League Baseball right fielders
Mansfield Braves players
Oklahoma City Indians players
People from Hamilton County, Ohio
Portland Beavers players
Richmond Virginians (minor league) players
St. Louis Browns players
Springfield Cubs players
Wilkes-Barre Barons (baseball) players